The Microregion of São José do Rio Preto is located on the north of São Paulo state, Brazil, and is made up of 29 municipalities. It belongs to the Mesoregion of São José do Rio Preto.

The microregion has a population of 763,534 inhabitants, in an area of 10,397.8 km²

Municipalities 
The microregion consists of the following municipalities, listed below with their 2010 Census populations (IBGE/2010):

Adolfo: 3,557
Altair: 3,815
Bady Bassitt: 14,603
Bálsamo: 8,160
Cedral: 7,972
Guapiaçu: 17,869
Guaraci: 9,976
Ibirá: 10,896
Icém: 7,462
Ipiguá: 4,463
Jaci: 5,657
José Bonifácio: 32,763
Mendonça: 4,640
Mirassol: 53,792
Mirassolândia: 4,295
Nova Aliança: 5,891
Nova Granada: 19,180
Olímpia: 50,024
Onda Verde: 3,884
Orindiúva: 5,675
Palestina: 11,051
Paulo de Faria: 8,589
Planalto: 4,463
Potirendaba:  15,449
São José do Rio Preto: 408,258
Tanabi: 24,055
Ubarana: 5,289
Uchoa: 9,471
Zacarias: 2,335

References

Sao